Harris Arcade may refer to:

Harris Arcade (Hickory), a historic commercial building located at Hickory, Catawba County, North Carolina, United States
Harris Arcade (Reading), a historic shopping arcade in Reading, Berkshire, United Kingdom